USS Execute (AM-232) was an  built for the United States Navy during World War II. She was reclassified as an Admirable-class minesweeper by the time of her June 1944 launch, and named Execute by the time of her November 1944 commissioning. After service in the Pacific during World War II, she was decommissioned in August 1946 and placed in reserve. While she remained in reserve, Execute was reclassified as MSF-232 in February 1955 but never reactivated. In 1962, she was sold to the Mexican Navy and renamed ARM DM-03. In 1994, she was renamed ARM General Juan N. Méndez (C51). She was stricken in July 2001, but her ultimate fate is not reported in secondary sources.

U.S. Navy career 
By the time of her November 15, 1944, commissioning, she had been assigned the name Execute.

Following shakedown cruise she departed for Pearl Harbor whence she escorted a convoy to Leyte via Eniwetok, Ulithi and Kossol Roads during February 1945. On March 26, as part of the preliminary assault force for the invasion of the Ryukyus, she screened landing craft against countless air attacks

Early in April she served with the Sweep Unit in clearing the bays of Nakagusuku and Chimu and defended vessels against kamikaze attack. She participated in the Battle of Okinawa. During this battle she picked up 70 survivors of the  after it had been hit by a Japanese plane. She remained on sweeping duty, participating in a feint landing on 20 April to draw attention from a large-scale advance on Naha. From June through September 10 she swept in the Yellow Sea and in Japanese coastal waters.

In March 1946, Execute transited the Panama Canal and on August 6, 1946, was placed out of commission in reserve at Orange, Texas. While she remained in reserve, Execute was reclassified (MSF-232) on February 7, 1955. She was stricken from the Navy List on May 1, 1962, and sold to Mexico later in the year.

Mexican Navy career 
The former Execute was acquired by the Mexican Navy in 1962 and renamed ARM DM-03. In 1994, she was renamed ARM General Juan N. Méndez (C51) after Juan N. Méndez. She was stricken on July 16, 2001, but her ultimate fate is not reported in secondary sources.

Notes

References 
 
 Robert G. Greaves 6 August 2006 formerly ET 2/C of the USNR and plank owner of the ship.

External links
 NavSource Online: Mine Warfare Vessel Photo Archive - Execute (MSF 232) - ex-AM-232 - ex-PCE-905

 

PCE-905-class patrol craft
Admirable-class minesweepers
Ships built by Lockheed Shipbuilding and Construction Company
1944 ships
World War II patrol vessels of the United States
World War II minesweepers of the United States
Admirable-class minesweepers of the Mexican Navy